Yermakovo is an urban-type settlement in Krasnoyarsk krai near the town of Igarka in Siberia. It was built in 1949 as a gulag to house the prisoners constructing the Salekhard–Igarka Railway. By 1955 it was abandoned. It was revitalised in the 2000s as a tourist town. The population in 2011 was 12. The main attraction for the town is a unique gulag museum.

References

External links

Urban-type settlements in Krasnoyarsk Krai
Populated places in Turukhansky District
Camps of the Gulag